Callin' the Blues is an album by guitarist Tiny Grimes with trombonist J. C. Higginbotham recorded in 1958 and released on the Prestige label. The album was subsequently rereleased on Prestige's Swingville subsidiary label.

Reception
The Allmusic site awarded the album 4 stars stating "Although J.C., who had a long decline, sounds a bit past his prime, plenty of sparks fly throughout the date, particularly from Grimes and Lockjaw".

Track listing 
All compositions by Tiny Grimes except where noted.
 "Callin' the Blues" – 8:42  
 "Blue Tiny" – 11:34  
 "Grimes' Times" – 11:20  
 "Air Mail Special" (Charlie Christian, Benny Goodman, Jimmy Mundy) – 7:33

Personnel 
Tiny Grimes – guitar
J. C. Higginbotham – trombone
Eddie "Lockjaw" Davis – tenor saxophone   
Ray Bryant – piano
Wendell Marshall – bass
Osie Johnson – drums

References 

Tiny Grimes albums
1958 albums
Albums recorded at Van Gelder Studio
Swingville Records albums
Albums produced by Esmond Edwards